Nigar Sultana may refer to:

 Nigar Sultana (actress) (1932–2000), Indian actress
 Nigar Sultana (cricketer), Bangladeshi cricketer